The United States Special Representative for Afghanistan and Pakistan (SRAP) was an office in the State Department that reported directly to the Secretary of State. Its purpose was to coordinate the department's activities in Afghanistan and Pakistan in connection with the War in Afghanistan (2001–2021), in conjunction with increased numbers of troops during the Obama presidency.

It transformed into the position of the U.S. Special Representative for Afghanistan Reconciliation (SRAR). Ambassador Zalmay Khalilzad was appointed to the position in September 2018, and stepped down following the withdrawal from Afghanistan. Deputy Special Representative Thomas West took his place and has served in the role since October 20, 2021.

Former special envoys 
 Richard Holbrooke (22 January 2009–13 December 2010)
 Marc Grossman (22 February 2011–14 December 2012)
 James Dobbins (10 May 2013–31 July 2014)
 Dan Feldman (1 August 2014–18 September 2015)
 Jarrett Blanc  (2015)
 Richard G. Olson (17 November 2015–November 2016)
 Laurel Miller  (November 2016–1 June 2017)
 Alice Wells  (2017)

References 

Agencies of the United States government